Mattéo Ahlinvi (born 2 July 1999) is a professional footballer who plays as midfielder for Ligue 2 club Dijon. Born in France, he represents the Benin national team.

Career
In April 2019, Ahlinvi signed with Nîmes Olympique. He made his first team debut with Nîmes in a 3–0 Coupe de la Ligue win over RC Lens on 29 October 2019. He signed his first professional contract with the club in June 2020.

On 14 June 2021, he signed a three-year contract with Dijon.

International career
Ahlinvi was born in France to a Beninese father and French mother. He was a youth international for France. He debuted for the Benin national team in a friendly 2-0 win over Gabon on 12 October 2020.

Personal life
Ahlinvi's brother Joris Ahlinvi is also a footballer, who was called up to represent the Benin national football team.

References

External links
 
 
 FFF Profile

1999 births
Living people
People from Arcachon
Citizens of Benin through descent
Beninese footballers
Benin international footballers
French footballers
France youth international footballers
Beninese people of French descent
French sportspeople of Beninese descent
Association football midfielders
En Avant Guingamp players
Nîmes Olympique players
Dijon FCO players
Ligue 1 players
Ligue 2 players
Championnat National 2 players
Championnat National 3 players
Sportspeople from Gironde
Footballers from Nouvelle-Aquitaine
Black French sportspeople